Warlord Krang is a fictional character appearing in American comic books published by Marvel Comics. He was a high-ranking member of the Atlantean military.

Publication history

Warlord Krang first appeared in Fantastic Four Annual #1 (1963), and was created by Stan Lee and Jack Kirby.

Fictional character biography
Warlord Krang was born in Atlantis City, Atlantis. He became a leader of the Atlantean military and warlord of Atlantis who rose to prominence during the time in which Namor, the Prince of Atlantis was missing. Upon Namor's return, Krang's bride-to-be, the Lady Dorma, deserted him for Namor, bringing a great hatred for Namor from Krang. Shortly thereafter, when Namor attempted  to conquer New York City, he made Krang his second in command. However, the Fantastic Four fought off the first attack and Namor stopped the invasion in order to save Sue Storm of the Fantastic Four. Feeling that Namor had betrayed his own people to save an enemy, Krang was even more angered and after the Atlanteans left Atlantis he seized control and usurped the throne of Atlantis from Namor. Krang imprisoned Namor, and forced the Prince to prove himself on a quest to find Neptune's trident, made additionally difficult by traps set by Krang. Meanwhile, Krang plotted a conquest of the surface world, ruled Atlantis as a despot, and put down a revolt against his rule. When Namor returned, he defeated Krang in personal combat. Krang was dethroned and exiled.

Krang, now a professional criminal, through the Puppet Master, set the Behemoth against Namor. While Namor was busy, Krang returned to Atlantis and tricked Lady Dorma into renewing their engagement and accompanying him to the surface world, as well as tricking Namor into believing that she had betrayed him and left willingly. Fleeing to the surface world with Dorma he would come into conflict with the armored avenger Iron Man, and fomented a battle between Namor and Iron Man. In a battle with Krang, Namor was inflicted with temporary amnesia. Krang used Atlantean technology to create a tidal wave in Manhattan. However Namor finally recovered, capturing Krang and defeating him in personal combat. Namor imprisoned him, exiling him once more. When Namor's evil cousin Byrrah seized the throne of Atlantis and invited Krang back to enjoy his former position, Krang formed an alliance with Byrrah and Attuma. This however was short-lived and soon Krang was forced to flee yet again when Byrrah's scheme failed.

After this he would attempt to steal the Serpent Crown, a powerful object, which would make him nearly invincible. These efforts however were thwarted by Namor and Captain America (who called himself Nomad at the time). Krang was driven fully insane. When Namor spent much time on the surface world allied with Doctor Doom, Krang once more seized control of Atlantis. Stealing the Trumpet Horn of Namor, he summoned the great beast Gargantus, to defeat the returning Namor, but it was soundly defeated by the Prince, while his ally, Dr. Doom, beat Krang within an inch of his life with a neuro-shock blade.

Somewhat after altering his physiology through the technological means of Wundagore Mountain, Krang has been recruited as a member of the Defenders.

Warlord Krang later appears as one of the Atlanteans living on the X-Men's base Utopia.

Powers and abilities
Krang has all the powers inherent to members of the Atlantean race, including superhuman strength. He is adapted to live underwater, having gills that allow him to breathe underwater, he can swim at high speeds and his body is resistant against the pressure and the cold of the deep oceans. His specially developed vision allows him to see clearly in the murky depths of the ocean.

Originally he could survive only for 9 minutes out of water, unless he uses a special serum that gives him the ability to breathe air, which changes his skin from blue to pink. This chemical allowed him to breathe surface air through his lungs (although when using this he temporarily loses his ability to breathe beneath the waves). He often wore a water-filled breathing helmet for operating on land. His stamina, agility, and reflexes were reduced when out of the water.

Krang later changed his own physiology through technological means to allow himself to breathe in water as well as on air indefinitely. This procedure also seems to have removed the limitation of his physical abilities when outside water and somewhat fortified his personal strength to an yet unknown degree.

He is a master of all forms of Atlantean armed and unarmed combat, and has achieved mastery of most Atlantean weapons. Krang is a master planner and strategist, and a skilled leader. He possesses a diabolic cunning and is an expert fencer.

Krang wears conventional Atlantean military attire over body armor of an unspecified composition. He wields an electrically charged sword known as a neuro-shock blade, and a standard Atlantean pistol firing bursts of concussive force. He wears a specially-designed battle helmet, and body armor over an electro-repellent chest-shield, and forged steel gauntlets equipped with electronic knuckles. He sometimes uses various other items which he has usually stolen such as the trumpet horn, and the serpent crown. In his exile he controls an army made up of remnants of Byrrah's and Attuma's armies, as well as a few surface men.

Other versions

Civil War: House of M
In the House of M reality, Warlord Krang was shown as Namor's aide.

In other media

Television
 Warlord Krang appeared in the "Sub-Mariner" segment of The Marvel Super Heroes, voiced by Paul Kligman.
 Warlord Krang appears in the Fantastic Four episode "Now Comes the Sub-Mariner" voiced by Neil Ross.

Video games
 Warlord Krang appears as a mini-boss in Marvel: Ultimate Alliance, voiced by Fred Tatasciore. He is a member of Doctor Doom's Masters of Evil. He is seen guarding the first sonic emitter with Byrrah (who he calls his cousin) after Attuma and Tiger Shark took over Atlantis. It is revealed by Uatu that if the player fails to get the rare Walek seaweed as one of the ingredients for a medicine needed to heal Namor, Krang will take the throne from the weakened Namor and command the Atlanteans to steal nuclear weapons in order to wage war against the surface.

References

External links
 Warlord Krang at Marvel.com

Characters created by Jack Kirby
Characters created by Stan Lee
Comics characters introduced in 1963
Fictional dictators
Fictional kings
Fictional mass murderers
Fictional military strategists
Fictional swordfighters in comics
Fictional warlords
Marvel Comics Atlanteans (Homo mermanus)
Marvel Comics characters with superhuman strength
Marvel Comics military personnel
Marvel Comics supervillains